= Udesian =

- Village
- Location in Punjab, India Udesian (India)
- Coordinates: 31.4137574°N 75.6826043°E
- Country: India
- State: Punjab
- District: Jalandhar
- Tehsil: Jalandhar - I

Government
  - Type: Panchayat raj
  - Body: Gram panchayat

Area
  - Total: 154 ha (380 acres)

Population (2011)
  - Total: 1,327; 669/658 ♂/♀
  - Scheduled Castes: 847; 426/421 ♂/♀
  - Total Households: 299

Languages
  - Official: Punjabi
- Time zone: UTC+5:30 (IST)
- ISO 3166 code: IN-PB
- Vehicle registration: PB-08
- Website: jalandhar.gov.in

Udesian is a village in Jalandhar - I in Jalandhar district of Punjab State, India. It is located 19 kilometres (12 mi) from district headquarter. The village is administrated by Sarpanch an elected representative of the village.

== Demography ==
As of 2011, The village has a total number of 299 houses and the population of 1327 of which 669 are males while 658 are females. According to the report published by Census India in 2011, out of the total population of the village 847 people are from Schedule Caste and the village does not have any Schedule Tribe population so far.

== See also ==
- List of villages in India
